Bowers is a census-designated place in Maxatawny Township, Berks County, Pennsylvania, United States.  It is located near the borough of Lyons and is on Sacony Creek, a tributary of the Maiden Creek.  As of the 2010 census, the population was 326 residents. Although Bowers has its own post office with the ZIP code of 19511, some residents are served by the Mertztown post office with the ZIP code of 19539.

Demographics

History
Bowers was founded in 1860 when the railroad was extended to that point. The community was named for the local Bower family.

External links
Bowers Chili Pepper Festival

References

Census-designated places in Berks County, Pennsylvania
Census-designated places in Pennsylvania